Babiak  is a village in Koło County, Greater Poland Voivodeship, in west-central Poland. It is the seat of the gmina (administrative district) called Gmina Babiak.

The village has a population of 1,700.

References

Villages in Koło County
Kalisz Governorate
Poznań Voivodeship (1921–1939)